Nick Damici is an American actor and screenwriter known for such films as Mulberry Street and Stake Land.

Early life 
Nick Damici grew up in Hell's Kitchen in the 1960s and early 1970s.  His father was a bartender, and Damici would occasionally tend bar at the age of 12. He is of mixed Italian and Canarian descent.

Career 
Damici's mentor is Michael Moriarty, who encouraged him to write scripts.  Acting remains his primary love; in an interview, he described writing as a "lonely, thankless job".  After he tired of supporting roles on television shows, he decided to write starring roles for himself.  Damici and Jim Mickle have worked together since 2001 and have collaborated on four films: Mulberry Street, Stake Land, We Are What We Are, and Cold in July.  Damici originally wrote Stake Land to be a web series, but Larry Fessenden was enthusiastic about making it into a feature film. In February 2013, he was cast in Adrian Garcia Bogliano's Late Phases.

Personal life 
Damici lives in New York City, where his girlfriend owns a bar.  He enjoys doo-wop bands.

Filmography

As Screenwriter

As actor 
 In the Cut (film) (2003)
 World Trade Center (2006)
 Stake Land (2010)
 We Are What We Are (2013)
 Late Phases (2014)
 Dark Was the Night (2014)
 Cold in July (2014)
 Stake Land II (2016)

References

External links 
 

Living people
American male film actors
American male screenwriters
People from Hell's Kitchen, Manhattan
21st-century American male actors
American people of Canarian descent
Screenwriters from New York (state)
Year of birth missing (living people)
American writers of Italian descent